Natasha Oakley (born July 14, 1990) is an Australian Instagram model. She came to prominence with her A Bikini A Day blog, which she founded with friend and business partner Devin Brugman in 2012. Oakley and Brugman went on to launch the retail brand "MONDAY Swimwear" in 2014.

Early life

Oakley was born and grew up in Bronte, New South Wales, Australia. She lived in Miami for three years from age 10 and spent two years in Maui, where she met business partner Brugman in 2009, before relocating to Los Angeles to launch her production company, Datreats Productions.

Career

Businesses

In 2012, aged 22, Oakley and her business partner Brugman founded A Bikini A Day as a lifestyle blog that posted a photo of them in a new swimsuit each day. Oakley told the Australian Financial Review "We immediately started getting inquiries through social media of how to get featured on our page. So I drew up the terms and conditions, and we were charging $100 a post to be featured on the page".

After gathering a large online following, in 2014, Oakley and Brugman launched their own swimwear brand, MONDAY Swimwear. New collections are released biannually utilizing a direct-to-consumer e-commerce model. The brand is known for eschewing logos and seasonal trends, instead of centering its designs around flattering fits and showcasing healthy rather than overly thin models.  The brand later expanded into beachwear, and in 2017 was named one of the top seven US swimwear brands for women by the Evening Standard. In 2017, Oakley was listed in the US's top athleisure clothing designers by Glamour.  As well as producing their clothing lines, the pair also have designed product collaborations with international brands, including Guess, Missguided UK, BikBok, and Wildfox. They have also partnered brands such as Tory Burch, Vix Swimwear, and Beach Riot.

In 2022, Elle magazine noted that Oakley's businesses had been estimated at over $63 million, and was listed on Australian Financial Review's 2021 Young Rich List.

Partnerships

Oakley has personally partnered with brands as an ambassador, including American Express Platinum, La Mer, Seafolly Australia, St. Tropez Tan, and Carolina Herrera.

Media

Oakley has been featured on the cover of international magazines, including Cosmopolitan Australia, Cosmopolitan Finland, Women’s Health UK, Women’s Health Germany, Collective Hub, Arcadia Magazine, and Women’s Health Fitness Magazine. Natasha also appeared on 60 Minutes with Peter Stefanovic in August 2017.

Personal life
Oakley's mother Lynette received the title Miss Australia in 1980, and went on to win Miss Universe Photogenic. Her father Guy was an Australian surf champion.  Oakley says that both her parents are entrepreneurs.  She has an older sister called Samantha and a younger half-sister, Sophia, through her mother. In July 2022, she became engaged to Theo Chambers.

See also
Devon Windsor, Instagram swimwear model
Camille Kostek, Instagram swimwear model

References 

1991 births
Living people
Models from Sydney
Australian female models
21st-century Australian businesswomen
21st-century Australian businesspeople
Australian women in business
Instagram accounts